Tokiori – Dobras do Tempo is a 2013 Brazilian documentary film directed by Paulo Pastorelo. The film follows the memory of five families of Japanese immigrants who settled in Brazil in the 1930s.

Synopsis 
The destinies of five families of Japanese immigrants crossed, between 1927 and 1934, in the rural neighborhood of Graminha, 45 km of Marília, São Paulo. The film follows the journey of memories of three generations of these families, creating a mosaic of different experiences. Contributions of this community still designs the reality of São Paulo and Brazil.

References

External links
 

2013 films
2010s Portuguese-language films
2010s Japanese-language films
Brazilian documentary films
Documentary films about immigration
2013 documentary films
2013 multilingual films
Brazilian multilingual films